Coiled-coil domain-containing protein 28B is a protein that in humans is encoded by the CCDC28B gene.

The product of this gene localizes to centrosomes and basal bodies. It interacts and colocalizes with several proteins associated with Bardet–Biedl syndrome (BBS).

References

External links

Further reading